The Messenger is the debut solo album by English musician Johnny Marr, formerly of the Smiths. It was released on 25 February 2013 in the UK (and made #10 in charts) through Warner Music Artist & Label Services / Warner Bros. Records, and on 26 February in the US through Sire Records.

Track listing

Personnel 
 Johnny Marr – guitars, vocals as well as ARP Omni, drums, bass, keyboards, Memory Moog synthesiser, and producer
 Nile Marr – soloist
 Max James – bass
 Jack Mitchell – drums
 Sonny Marr – backing vocals
 Doviak – backing vocals, producer
 Frank Arkwright – mastering
 Mat Bancroft – photography
 Johnathan Elliott – layout
 Robin Hurley – management
 Claudius Mittendorfer – mixing
 Joe Moss – management

Single releases
"Upstarts" was released as a promotional single digitally and on 7", with the new B-side "Psychic Beginner".

"New Town Velocity" was later also released as a single digitally and on 7", along with the new B-side "The It-Switch".

Videos were made for both of these singles, as well as the title track.

References

2013 debut albums
Johnny Marr albums
Warner Records albums